Jerez Club de Fútbol is a Spanish football team based in Jerez de los Caballeros, in the autonomous community of Extremadura. Founded in 1969, it plays in Tercera División – Group 14.

History
Jerez Club de Fútbol was formed in 1969, in the small historic town of Jerez de los Caballeros. The early years were spent in the regional leagues of Extremadura, the club's first venture into Tercera División coming in the season 1984–85, which was however short-lived (immediate relegation).

The team returned a year later, and slowly began to improve performances, to the extent that by 1992–93 they reached the play-offs for third level for the first time. Promotion via this way was to prove a tortuous affair however, with regular high finishes in the regular season amounting to nothing in the knockout stages: the first disappointment occurred in 1992–93 when, after finishing the season third, they lost 1–3 on aggregate to Atlético Malagueño.

Jerez CF won its first Tercera title in 1993–94, but only won two of six matches in the playoffs. The following season brought a second place behind CD Don Benito, and the playoffs elimination at the hands of reborn Málaga CF – the team finished third, behind CD Isla Cristina and above UD Puertollano.

In 1995–96, Jerez finished second behind CP Cacereño, recording impressive wins over Guarena (10–0, home) and at CP Sanvicenteño (11–0, away); both clubs scored more than 120 goals during the campaign. In the playoffs, more of the same, with the club ranking third, with CD Guadix eventually promoting. The following year brought its second fourth division title, but another playoff elimination, against Andalusia's Isla Cristina.

After five successive failures in the play-offs, Jerez finally won promotion to the third category in 1998 (after renewing its regular season supremacy), after a 0–0 draw against Vélez. The 1998–99 season was the first of seven consecutive seasons in the third division. Jerez finished 12th, after notable wins against Granada CF (4–0), Sevilla B (5–0) and Real Jaén (1–2), for a total of 54 points (44 in the following, and four consecutive top ten finishes afterwards).

In 2000–01, the competition was reduced to 36 games, following Polideportivo Almería's disbanding, and Jerez finished ninth, with 47 points; the season's highest point was a 4–2 triumph at eventual champions Cádiz CF (the club also obtained the same position in 2002–03).

The 2003–04 season was Jerez's most successful in terms of points, and although the club finally ranked eighth, it battled for a play-off berth until the final few weeks of the season, and only conceded 29 league goals, second-best in its group, but lost valuable points in October/November 2003, with five consecutive draws.

The club's run in the third level came to an end in the following season, which was almost entirely spent in the relegation zone, with Jerez failing to win any of its last six matches. In 2007 and 2008, it returned to the promotion play-offs, being defeated respectively by CF Gavà (2–4 aggregate) and CD Ciempozuelos (1–5). The club finished 6th in the 2018-19 season in Tercera División, Group 14.

Club naming
Club Polideportivo Vasco Núñez — 1971–1990
Club Polideportivo Cristian Lay — 1990–1994
Jerez Club de Fútbol — 1994–present

Season to season

7 seasons in Segunda División B
25 seasons in Tercera División

Famous players

 Darío Delgado
 Cristian Green
  Natanael Borengue
 Juan Carlos Castilla
 José María Cidoncha
 Raúl García
 Paco Peña

Stadium
Jerez play home games at the Estadio Manuel Calzado Galván, which has a capacity of 5,000.

References

External links
Futbolme team profile 
Former official website 

 
Association football clubs established in 1969
1969 establishments in Spain
Province of Badajoz